Oscar Erickson was an American football coach.  Erickson was the second head football coach at Marquette University located in Milwaukee, Wisconsin and he held that position for the 1902 season.  His coaching record at Marquette was 6–1–1.

Head coaching record

References

Year of birth missing
Year of death missing
Marquette Golden Avalanche football coaches